Astrid Jadot (née Ullens de Schooten Whettnall, known as Astrid Whettnall; born 17 March 1971) is a Belgian stage and film actress. She studied at the Kleine Academy in Brussels and began working in theatre. Her film credits include Capital (2012), In the Name of the Son (2012), Salaud, on t'aime (2014), Yves Saint Laurent (2014), Marguerite (2015), and Close Enemies (2018).

She received the Magritte Award for Best Actress for her work in Road to Istanbul (2016).

Early life and family
She is daughter of Charles-Albert Ullens de Schooten Whettnall (1927-2006) and his wife Countess Madeleine Bernadotte (b. 1938). Through her maternal grandfather Prince Carl Bernadotte, she is great-great-granddaughter of King Oscar II of Sweden and Norway and King Frederick VIII of Denmark; being she a third cousin of King Carl XVI Gustaf of Sweden, second cousin of King Philippe of Belgium and Grand Duke Henri of Luxembourg and second cousin, once removed, of Queen Margrethe II of Denmark and Queen Anne-Marie of Greece. She is also a descendant of King George II of Great Britain and King William I of the Netherlands.

Selected filmography

References

External links

1971 births
Living people
Belgian film actresses
Belgian stage actresses
Magritte Award winners
20th-century Belgian actresses
21st-century Belgian actresses
Belgian people of Swedish descent